James Chapman (6 November 1932 – 12 November 1993) was  a former Australian rules footballer who played with Fitzroy in the Victorian Football League (VFL).

Notes

External links 		
		
		
		
		
		
		
		
1932 births		
1993 deaths		
Australian rules footballers from Victoria (Australia)		
Fitzroy Football Club players
Melbourne High School Old Boys Football Club players